Shtil' is a series of Russian space launch vehicles.

Shtil (in Cyrillic: Штиль, Russian for "calm", may also refer to:

 "Shtil (Calm)", a 2001 song by the band Aria

See also
 Stihl, a German manufacturer